Nahr-e Dalli (also Romanized as Nahr-e Dallī and Nahr-e Dalī) is a village in Buzi Rural District, in the Central District of Shadegan County, Khuzestan Province, Iran. At the 2006 census, its population was 581, in 120 families.

References 

Populated places in Shadegan County